Montauriol is the name of the following communes in France:

 Montauriol, Aude, in the Aude department
 Montauriol, Lot-et-Garonne, in the Lot-et-Garonne department
 Montauriol, Pyrénées-Orientales, in the Pyrénées-Orientales department
 Montauriol, Tarn, in the Tarn department